The Living End is a Hüsker Dü live album recorded at various venues in October 1987 but not released until 1994. It spans the band's entire recorded output, from "Data Control" off Land Speed Record, the band's debut, to a number of songs from the band's last studio album, Warehouse: Songs and Stories. There are also some unreleased tracks and a cover of the Ramones' "Sheena Is a Punk Rocker."

Recording and reception
Guitarist Bob Mould and drummer Grant Hart handled the overwhelming share of songwriting duties in the band, though Greg Norton has a solo credit for "Everytime" . The track listing is reflective of the band's set lists. "New Day Rising" was a common choice to open shows. As explained in the liner notes, the band preferred to group like-minded songs into what they called "packs of three." Examples of these "packs" include "Standing in the Rain" followed by "Back from Somewhere" and "Ice Cold Ice," as well as "Terms of Psychic Warfare" followed by "Powerline" and "Books About UFOs."

Over half of the songs were recorded at Le Spectrum in Montreal. Songs from seven different performances were compiled by producer and long time Husker Du sound man, Lou Giordano.

Franklin Soults of The Chicago Reader praised the album, writing that "as a recap of Hüsker Dü’s epic career, it’s more instructive and exciting than any boxed set could have been. Vividly reconstructed from several dates on the tour taped by their sound man, Lou Giordano, the record has many unexpected sequences in which the meaning of each tune is deepened by its proximity to other songs and by the intensity of the band’s seamless, full-throttle execution. It proves the thrill wasn’t all high-volume buzz and ringing overtones: this band could play." Milo Miles of The New York Times conceded that "the band's enveloping noise always eluded recording," but he argued that their "headlong dynamics and sudden bursts of roaring compassion" were well-documented in The Living End.

The album was deleted from the Warner Bros catalogue in 2003, and reissued through Rhino Entertainment's Encore imprint in June 2008. In an interview with Spin magazine in January 2008, Bob Mould stated that he had never heard this album.

The liner notes were written by rock critic David Fricke and discuss the band's disintegration. The liner notes also mention several songs that were considered for inclusion on the album, but were left off due to space reasons.

Track listing

Personnel
Credits adapted from the album's liner notes.

Hüsker Dü
Bob Mould – guitar, vocals
Greg Norton – bass, vocals
Grant Hart – drums, vocals
 Technical
Hüsker Dü – producer
Lou Giordano – producer, engineer, sequencing, editing
Howie Weinberg – mastering
Fake Name Graphx – art direction
Kirsten Turbenson – artwork
Daniel Corrigan –  photography
Doug Myren – project coordinator

References

Hüsker Dü albums
Albums produced by Bob Mould
Albums produced by Lou Giordano
1994 live albums
Warner Records live albums
Albums recorded at the Spectrum (Montreal)